Matuschek is a German language surname. It stems from the male given name Matthaeus. Notable people with the name include:

Hubert Matuschek (1902–1968), Austrian architect
Oliver Matuschek, German author and scholar

References 

Surnames of Austrian origin
German-language surnames
Surnames from given names